Wheeling Hospital is a 223 bed hospital in Wheeling, West Virginia. Originally founded in 1850, it is one of the oldest hospitals in the United States in continuous operation as an institution. It was founded by visitation nuns and later became affiliated with the convent of the Sisters of St. Joseph. During the Civil War, the hospital was used by the military.

In the 1980s, a new hospital complex was built in the Clator neighborhood of Wheeling, and the original hospital in North Wheeling was demolished in the 1990s.

See also
List of the oldest hospitals in the United States

References

External links
Official website

Hospitals in West Virginia
Hospitals established in 1850
Trauma centers